Mary Dixon may refer to:
 Mary Bartlett Dixon, American nurse and suffragist
 Mary J. Scarlett Dixon, American physician
 Mary Dixon (murder victim), victim of serial killer Mary Ann Britland
 Mary Dixon Kies, née Dixon, American inventor